Francesco del Pozzo (died 7 March 1593) was a Roman Catholic prelate who served as Bishop of Agrigento (1591–1593).

Biography
On 23 January 1591, Francesco del Pozzo was appointed by Pope Gregory XIV as Bishop of Agrigento. 
In 1591, he was consecrated bishop.
He served as Bishop of Agrigento until his death on 7 March 1593.

References

External links and additional sources
 (for Chronology of Bishops)
 (for Chronology of Bishops) 

1593 deaths
16th-century Roman Catholic bishops in Sicily
Bishops appointed by Pope Gregory XIV